The Freedom Party of South Tyrol (FPS) was a regionalist national-liberal political party in South Tyrol.

History
It was launched in 1988 as the continuation of the Party of Independents by Gerold Meraner. In the 1988 provincial election FPS took 1.4% and got Meraner elected to the Provincial Council. The party was soon merged with the South Tyrolean Homeland Federation of Eva Klotz and conservative splinters from the South Tyrolean People's Party led by Alfons Benedikter to form the Union for South Tyrol.

In December 1992 a group of dissidents from the South Tyrolean People's Party led by Christian Waldner founded Die Freiheitlichen. They were joined by some former members of the FPS around Martin Wenter who left the Union for South Tyrol after internal conflicts in 1993. Gerold Meraner later identified Die Freiheitlichen as the legitimate heir of the FPS.

References

Defunct political parties in South Tyrol
German nationalist political parties
National liberal parties
South Tyrolean nationalism